Rhodes House may refer to:

United Kingdom:
Rhodes House in Oxford

United States (by state):
Rhodes Cabin, Baker, NV, (listed on the NRHP in Nevada)
Christopher Rhodes House, Warwick, RI, (listed on the NRHP in Rhode Island)
Rhodes House (Brighton, Tennessee), (listed on the NRHP in Tennessee)
Henry A. and Birdella Rhodes House, Tacoma, WA, (listed on the NRHP in Washington)